The Loss of the Birkenhead is a 1914 British silent historical drama film directed by Maurice Elvey and starring Elisabeth Risdon, Fred Groves and A. V. Bramble. The film is set against the backdrop of the sinking of the troopship  in 1852.

Cast
 Elisabeth Risdon as Deborah 
 Fred Groves as Seth 
 A. V. Bramble   
 M. Gray Murray   
 Joyce Templeton   
 Beatrix Templeton

References

Bibliography
 Murphy, Robert. Directors in British and Irish Cinema: A Reference Companion. British Film Institute, 2006.

External links
 

1914 films
British historical drama films
British silent feature films
1910s English-language films
Films directed by Maurice Elvey
1910s historical drama films
Seafaring films
Films about seafaring accidents or incidents
Films set in 1852
British black-and-white films
1914 drama films
1910s British films
Silent drama films
Silent adventure films